Steve Cox may refer to:

Steve Cox (artist)
Steve Cox (American football)
Steve Cox (baseball)
Steve Cox (wrestler)
 Steve Cox, a former member of Dazz Band

See also
Stephen Cox (disambiguation)
Cox (surname)